Aktaş is a village in the Tercan District, Erzincan Province, Turkey. The village had a population of 47 in 2021.

The hamlets of Altınca, Fettah, Sırmalı and Zincirli are attached to the village.

References 

Villages in Tercan District